Chalmer E. Woodard (c. 1917 – December 9, 1996) was an American football player, coach of football, basketball, and track, and college athletics administrator.  He served as the head football coach at McPherson College from 1950 to 1952, at Southern Methodist University (SMU) from 1953 to 1956, and at the Municipal University of Wichita—now known as the University of Wichita—from 1957 to 1959, compiling a career college football record of 47–45–4.

Coaching career

McPherson 
Woodard was the head football, basketball and track coach and athletic director at McPherson College in McPherson, Kansas from 1950 to 1952.  His football coaching record at McPherson was 18–7–1.

SMU
Woodard left McPherson to become the head football coach at Southern Methodist University in Dallas, Texas. He resigned as SMU coach after two consecutive losing seasons in 1956.

Wichita State
Soon after leaving SMU, Woodard signed a three-year contract to coach the University of Wichita (now Wichita State University) in his hometown of Wichita, Kansas and he held that position for three seasons, from 1957 until 1959.  His record at Wichita was 10–18–2.  After three seasons, his contract was not renewed.

Head coaching record

College football

References

1910s births
1996 deaths
McPherson Bulldogs athletic directors
McPherson Bulldogs football coaches
McPherson Bulldogs men's basketball coaches
SMU Mustangs football coaches
Southwestern Moundbuilders football players
Wichita State Shockers football coaches
College track and field coaches in the United States
High school basketball coaches in the United States
High school football coaches in Kansas
Coaches of American football from Kansas
Players of American football from Wichita, Kansas
Basketball coaches from Kansas